The John Moores Painting Prize is a biennial award to the best contemporary  painting, submission is open to the public. The prize is named for Sir John Moores, noted philanthropist, who established the award in 1957. The winning work and short-listed pieces are exhibited at the Walker Art Gallery as part of the Liverpool Biennial festival of visual art.

Winners 
 1957 Jack Smith - "Creation and Crucifixion"
 1959 Patrick Heron - "Black Painting - Red, Brown and Olive : July 1959"
 1961 Henry Mundy - "Cluster"
 1963 Roger Hilton - "March 1963"
 1965 Michael Tyzack - " Alesso 'B' "
 1967 David Hockney - "Peter Getting Out of Nick's Pool"
 1969 Richard Hamilton and Mary Martin - "Toaster" and "Cross" (respectively)
 1972 Euan Uglow - "Nude, 12 vertical positions from the eye"
 1974 Myles Murphy - "Figure with Yellow Foreground"
 1976 John Walker - "Juggernaut with plume - for P Neruda"
 1978 Noel Forster - "A painting in six stages with a silk triangle"
 1980 Michael Moon - "Box-room"
 1982 John Hoyland - "Broken Bride 13.6.82"
 1995 David Leapman - Double-Tongued Knowability
 1993 Peter Doig - "Blotter"
 1991 Andrzej Jackowski - "The Beekeeper's son"
 1989 Lisa Milroy - "Handles"
 1987 Tim Head - "Cow mutations"
 1985 Bruce McLean - Oriental Garden Kyoto
 1997 Dan Hays - "Harmony in Green"
 1999 Michael Raedecker - "Mirage"
 2002 Peter Davies - "Super Star Fucker - Andy Warhol Text Painting"
 2004 Alexis Harding - "Slump/Fear (orange/black)"
 2006 Martin Greenland - "Before Vermeer's Clouds"
 2008 Peter McDonald - "Fontana"
 2010 Keith Coventry - "Spectrum Jesus"
 2012 Sarah Pickstone - "Stevie Smith and the Willow"
 2014 Rose Wylie - "PV Windows and Floorboards"
 2016 Michael Simpson - "Squint (19)"
 2018 Jacqui Hallum - "King and Queen of Wands"
 2021 Kathryn Maple - "The Common"

See also

 List of European art awards

References

External links
 John Moores Painting Prize

Art biennials
British biennial events
British art awards
1957 establishments in the United Kingdom
Awards established in 1957